Cnemaspis smaug is a species of diurnal, rock-dwelling, insectivorous gecko endemic to India.

References

 Cnemaspis smaug

smaug
Reptiles of India
Reptiles described in 2021
Organisms named after Tolkien and his works